Chevrillon Lake is a freshwater body crossed by the Chibougamau River, in the southern part of Eeyou Istchee James Bay (municipality), in the administrative region of Nord-du-Québec, in the province of Quebec, in Canada.

The lake is part of the townships of Vienna, Barlow, Blaiklock and McKenzie. Forestry is the main economic activity of the sector. Recreational tourism activities come second.

The Chevrillon Lake hydrographic slope is accessible via a R1029 forest road serving the Southwest of "Lac du Sauvage" and separating from the road leading to the village of Oujé-Bougoumou. This last road is attached to route 113 linking Lebel-sur-Quévillon to Chibougamau.

The surface of Chevrillon Lake is usually frozen from early November to mid-May, however safe ice circulation is generally from mid-November to mid-April.

Geography

Toponymy
Formerly, this name has been designated "Lake Rush" and "Lake Rush". The term "Chevrillon" is a family name of French origin.

The toponym "Lac Chevrillon" was officialized on December 5, 1968 by the Commission de toponymie du Québec when it was created.

Notes and references

See also 

Eeyou Istchee James Bay
Lakes of Nord-du-Québec
Nottaway River drainage basin
Jamésie